Edward Alonzo Greene (August 19, 1875 – February 23, 1957) was an American sports shooter. He competed in two events at the 1908 Summer Olympics. He later served as a colonel in the United States Marine Corps. He was also a leader in the Fort Gaines Lock and Dam Project. He died at the Bethesda Naval Hospital in 1957.

References

1875 births
1957 deaths
American male sport shooters
United States Distinguished Marksman
Olympic shooters of the United States
Shooters at the 1908 Summer Olympics
Place of birth missing